Sludge metal (also known as sludge or sludge doom) is an extreme subgenre of heavy metal music that originated through combining elements of doom metal and hardcore punk. It is typically harsh and abrasive, often featuring shouted vocals, heavily distorted instruments and sharply contrasting tempos. The Melvins from the US state of Washington produced the first sludge metal albums in the mid-late 1980s.

Characteristics
The key characteristics of both sludge and doom metal are a slow tempo combined with down-tuned, heavily-distorted guitars to deliver the heaviest feel that is possible. The drummer must be able to lead the band through the slow parts of a piece with an accurate time feel, which is much harder to achieve when compared with playing faster pieces. Sludge metal includes sections of the aggression, shouted vocals and occasional fast tempos of hardcore punk.

As The New York Times wrote on The Melvins, "The shorthand term for the kind of rock descending from early Black Sabbath and late Black Flag is sludge, because it's so slow and dense." According to Metal Hammer, sludge metal "[s]pawned from a messy collision of Black Sabbath's downcast metal, Black Flag's tortured hardcore and the sub/dom grind of early Swans, shaken up with lashings of cheap whisky and bad pharmaceuticals". Mike IX Williams, vocalist for Eyehategod, suggests that "the moniker of sludge apparently has to do with the slowness, the dirtiness, the filth and general feel of decadence the tunes convey".

Due to the similarities between sludge and stoner metal, there is often a crossover between the two genres, but sludge metal generally avoids stoner metal's usage of psychedelia.

History

In the early 1980s, the Seattle branch of the indie movement was influenced by punk rock, however it removed its speed and its structure and added elements of metal. The Melvins slowed down punk rock to develop their own slow, heavy, sludgy sound. In 1984, the punk rock band Black Flag went visiting small towns across the US to bring punk to the more remote parts of the country. By this time their music had become slow and sludgy, less like the Sex Pistols and more like Black Sabbath, as heard on albums such as My War. Krist Novoselic (later the bassist with Nirvana) recalls going along with the Melvins to see one of these shows, after which the Melvins frontman Buzz Osborne began writing "slow and heavy riffs" to form a dirge–like music that was the beginning of northwest grunge. In the remoteness of Montesano, Washington, the Melvins were able to experiment without fear of rejection but also to reach an audience and interact with other bands. Initially, the Melvins played hardcore punk, and when other bands were doing the same they slowed down as much as they could and added heavy metal into their mix.
 
The Melvins' Six Songs (1986) is regarded as the first sludge album, with Gluey Porch Treatments (1987) regarded as the first post-punk sludge album. The hardcore punk spasms that the Melvins mixed into the dirge-like songs of Gluey Porch Treatments provides one of the key differences that distinguishes sludge from doom metal. At this time, the band was also key in the development of the Washington grunge scene. Nirvana's single "Love Buzz/Big Cheese" (1988) was described by their record label Sub Pop as "heavy pop sludge". The Seattle music author and journalist Gillian G. Gaar writes that Nirvana's debut studio album Bleach "does have its share – some would say more than its share – of dirty sludge".

The American music author and journalist Michael Azerrad described the short-lived Seattle band Blood Circus (1988) as a sludge metal band, with rock journalist Ned Raggett writing in AllMusic describing the band's music as "rough and ready, sludgy guitar rock with a bad attitude". Examples of crossover tracks between sludge and grunge include Soundgarden's "Slaves & Bulldozers" (1991) and Alice in Chains' "Sludge Factory" (1995). Soundgarden is described as having demonstrated both the good and bad aspects of fusing punk and sludge metal.

According to vocalist Phil Anselmo:

Key bands in the development of sludge metal include Acid Bath, Buzzoven, Corrupted, Crowbar, Down, Eyehategod, and Grief in addition to the Melvins. By the late 1990s, small sludge scenes could be found across many countries.

By the early 2000s, sludge metal had formed cross-over works with stoner metal. Examples of cross-over tracks between sludge and stoner metal include Bongzilla's "Gateway" and High on Fire's "The Yeti".

Sludgecore

Eyehategod formed in Harvey, Louisiana, in 1988 and is credited with originating a new style - New Orleans hardcore-edged sludge. Another point of view is that New Orleans was the birthplace of the sludgecore movement, with Eyehategod being given the most credit for it. Sludgecore combines sludge metal with hardcore punk, and possesses a slow pace, a low guitar tuning, and a grinding dirge-like feel. Bands regarded as sludgecore include Acid Bath, Eyehategod, and Soilent Green, and all three formed in Louisiana. Crowbar formed in 1991 and mixed "detuned, lethargic sludged-out metal with hardcore and southern elements". According to rock journalist Steve Huey writing in AllMusic, Eyehategod was a sludge metal band that became part of the "Southern sludgecore scene". This scene also included Crowbar and Down, with all three bands being influenced by Black Flag, Black Sabbath, and the Melvins. Some of these bands incorporated Southern rock influences.

Eyehategod's debut album In the Name of Suffering includes slow-paced songs similar to early Melvins, but contains a few fast-tempo hardcore punk passages. The guitars (electric guitar and bass guitar) are often played with large amounts of feedback. Vocals are usually shouted or screamed. The lyrics of Crowbar are generally pessimistic in nature. Buzzoven's lyrics concern drug abuse, and Acid Bath's concern rape, abortion, death, and self-loathing.

See also
 List of sludge metal bands
 Crust punk

References

Publications
 

 
Hardcore punk genres
Heavy metal genres
Music of Louisiana
Extreme metal
American rock music genres